Statistics of Division 2 of Swedish football for the 1924–25 season.

League standings

Division 2 Uppsvenska Serien 1924–25 
Teams from a large part of northern Sweden, approximately above the province of Medelpad, were not allowed to play in the national league system until the 1953–54 season, and a championship was instead played to decide the best team in Norrland.

No teams from Uppsvenska Serien were allowed to be promoted to Allsvenskan, due to both geographic and economic reasons.

Division 2 Mellansvenska Serien 1924–25

Division 2 Östsvenska Serien 1924–25

Division 2 Västsvenska Serien 1924–25

Division 2 Sydsvenska Serien 1924–25

Footnotes

References
Sweden - List of final tables (Clas Glenning)

Swedish Football Division 2 seasons
2
Sweden